Ajorluy-ye Sharqi Rural District is in Nokhtalu District of Baruq County, West Azerbaijan province, Iran. At the National Census of 2006, its population was 4,903 in 969 households, when it was in the former Baruq District of Miandoab County. There were 4,027 inhabitants in 1,023 households at the following census of 2011. At the most recent census of 2016, the population of the rural district was 3,816 in 1,088 households. The largest of its 28 villages was Mohammadqoli Qeshlaq, with 366 people. After the census, Baruq District was separated from Miandoab County, elevated to the status of a county, and divided into two districts: the Central and Nokhtalu Districts.

References 

Rural Districts of West Azerbaijan Province

Populated places in West Azerbaijan Province